Patrick Joseph Leahy (born March 19, 1951) is a former placekicker in the National Football League (NFL) for the New York Jets. He played college soccer at Saint Louis University.

Early years
Leahy attended Augustinian Academy. He accepted a soccer scholarship from Saint Louis University. As a starting midfielder, he helped lead the school to 4 soccer NCAA finals, winning 3 national championships, while also receiving All-American honors.

In 1994, he was inducted into the Billiken Hall of Fame. In 2007, he was inducted into the Missouri Sports Hall of Fame Inductee.

Professional career

St. Louis Cardinals
Leahy was signed as an undrafted free agent by the St. Louis Cardinals after the 1973 NFL Draft, having participated in an open try-out, even though he didn't play football in college.

In 1974, he was re-signed to be a part of training camp. Even though the Cardinals made the unusual move of keeping 2 kickers on the final roster, they chose to keep Jim Bakken and fellow rookie and ex-soccer player Sergio Albert. Leahy was waived on August 29.

New York Jets
In 1974 he was signed by the New York Jets as a free agent, after Bobby Howfield suffered a leg injury. He began on a standby basis until replacing Howfield.

In 1979 he suffered a right knee sprain during a practice while running pass patterns simulating an opposing team's wide receiver. He played in only 6 games after being placed on the injured reserve list.

In 1985 he set the franchise record for the longest field goal of 55 yards. In 1986, he set the franchise record for consecutive successful field goals made with 22, which was broken by Jay Feely in 2009.

In 1991, he played in 15 games but was replaced by Raul Allegre for the season finale because of a sciatic nerve condition.

On July 6, 1992, he announced his retirement because of a recurring sciatic nerve condition in his right leg.  At the time, he ranked third in scoring in NFL history, was the Jets all-time leading scorer, with 1,470 points and scored 100 points or more in seven seasons. Over the course of his career, Leahy completed 71.4% of his field goal attempts and 95.5% of his extra points. He currently ranks 24th on the list of highest NFL career scoring leaders.

Career regular season statistics
Career high/best bolded

Personal life
Leahy and his wife, Colleen, currently live in St. Louis and have three children: Lizzy, Cullen, and the youngest Nora.

References

1951 births
Living people
Soccer players from St. Louis
Players of American football from St. Louis
American football placekickers
Saint Louis Billikens men's soccer players
New York Jets players
Association football midfielders
American soccer players